Whiskey Creek is a census-designated place (CDP) in Lee County, Florida, United States. The population was 4,842 at the 2020 census. It is part of the Cape Coral-Fort Myers, Florida Metropolitan Statistical Area.

Geography
Whiskey Creek is located in central Lee County at  (26.577502, -81.889836). It is bordered to the north by the city of Fort Myers, the Lee county seat. To the west it is bordered by the Caloosahatchee River and by a small tributary, Whiskey Creek, for which the community is named. To the west across Whiskey Creek is the CDP of McGregor, while to the south is Cypress Lake and to the east are Villas, Pine Manor, and a southern extension of Fort Myers.

Demographics

As of the census of 2000, there were 4,806 people, 2,199 households, and 1,517 families residing in the CDP. The racial makeup of the CDP was 96.57% White, 0.96% African American, 0.08% Native American, 0.71% Asian, 0.02% Pacific Islander, 0.44% from other races, and 1.23% from two or more races. Hispanic or Latino of any race were 2.29% of the population.

There were 2,199 households, out of which 19.7% had children under the age of 18 living with them, 61.1% were married couples living together, 6.0% had a female householder with no husband present, and 31.0% were non-families. 26.6% of all households were made up of individuals, and 17.8% had someone living alone who was 65 years of age or older.  The average household size was 2.19 and the average family size was 2.62.

In the CDP, the population was spread out, with 17.0% under the age of 18, 3.1% from 18 to 24, 19.0% from 25 to 44, 27.8% from 45 to 64, and 33.1% who were 65 years of age or older.  The median age was 53 years. For every 100 females, there were 87.3 males.  For every 100 females age 18 and over, there were 82.5 males.

The median income for a household in the CDP was $52,068, and the median income for a family was $60,383. Males had a median income of $40,911 versus $30,094 for females. The per capita income for the CDP was $29,304.  About 1.7% of families and 2.2% of the population were below the poverty line, including 1.3% of those under age 18 and 2.4% of those age 65 or over.

References

Census-designated places in Lee County, Florida
Census-designated places in Florida